Sylwester may refer to:
Stanisław Sylwester Szarzyński (1650–1720), Polish composer
Sylwester Bednarek (born 1989), Polish high jumper
Sylwester Braun (1909–1996), Polish photographer, Home Army officer
Sylwester Chęciński (born 1930), Polish film and television director
Sylwester Chruszcz (born 1972), Polish politician and Member of the European Parliament
Sylwester Czereszewski (born 1971), Polish footballer
Sylwester Kaliski (1925–1978), Polish engineer and general
Sylwester Pawłowski (born 1958), Polish politician
Sylwester Porowski (born 1938), Polish physicist specializing in solid-state and high pressure physics
Sylwester Szmyd (born 1978), Polish professional road bicycle racer

See also
Robert Sylwester (born 1927), Emeritus Professor of Education at the University of Oregon in the US
Sylwester Glacier, Antarctic glacier flowing north between Jacobs Nunatak and MacAlpine Hills into Law Glacier, named after David L. Sylwester